The 2006 First Division season was the 38th of the amateur  competition of the first-tier football in the Gambia.  The tournament was organized by the Gambian Football Association (GFA) .  The season began on February 1 and finished in late April.  The Gambia Ports Authority won the fifth title and qualified and competed in the 2007 CAF Champions League the following season.  Hawks FC, winner of the 2005 Gambian Cup participated in the 2006 CAF Confederation Cup the following season..

The season featured a total of 162 matches and scored a total of 100 goals, less than half than last season and more than 40% from 2004.

Wallidan FC was once again the defending team of the title. Gambia Ports Authority finished with 33 points. Hawks scored the most goals numbering 16.  Cherno Samba Academy scored the fewest numbering five.

Participating clubs

 Wallidan FC
 Steve Biko FC
 Real de Banjul
 Interior FC - Promoted from the Second Division
 Hawks FC

 Gambia Ports Authority FC
 Armed Forces FC
 Bakau United
 Cherno Samba Academy FC (Samger) - Promoted from the Second Division
 Gamtel FC

Overview
The league was contested by 10 teams with Wallidan FC again winning the championship.

League standings

See also
GFA League First Division

Footnotes

External links
Historic results at rsssf.com

Gambia
Gambia
GFA League First Division seasons
First